The Sri Lanka cricket team toured New Zealand in December 2015 and January 2016 to play two Test matches, five One Day Internationals (ODIs) and two Twenty20 Internationals (T20Is).

New Zealand won the Test series 2–0, the ODI series 3–1 and the T20I series 2–0. With the T20I defeat, Sri Lanka lost their number one spot in the T20I rankings after 16 months.

Squads

Vishwa Fernando was added to Sri Lanka's Test squad as a replacement for Dhammika Prasad after Prasad injured his back in the tour match. Nuwan Kulasekara was named as Prasad's replacement in the ODI squad. Kaushal Silva was added to Sri Lanka's Test squad for Kusal Perera after Kusal tested positive for a banned substance due to suspect in doping violation by the International Cricket Council (ICC). Lasith Malinga was originally named as the T20I captain for Sri Lanka, but suffered a knee injury and was replaced by Dinesh Chandimal. Danushka Gunathilaka and Suranga Lakmal were also added to Sri Lanka's T20I squad. Trent Boult returned for the final ODI in place of Matt Henry while George Worker was dropped. Tim Southee was ruled out of the T20I series because of a foot injury and was replaced by Matt Henry.

Tour match

Three Day: New Zealand Cricket Board President's XI vs Sri Lankans

Test series

1st Test

2nd Test

ODI series

1st ODI

2nd ODI

3rd ODI

4th ODI

5th ODI

T20I series

1st T20I

2nd T20I

References

External links
 Series home at ESPN Cricinfo

2016 in Sri Lankan cricket
2016 in New Zealand cricket
International cricket competitions in 2015–16
Sri Lankan cricket tours of New Zealand